Eyre Fjord is a fjord in Chile. The fjord has two side fjords on its eastern side called Falcon and Exmouth. The mountains surrounding the fjord reach .

References

See also
 Brüggen Glacier

Fjords of Chile
Bodies of water of Magallanes Region